USS Atlantis may refer to the following ships operated by the United States Navy:

 , was a patrol boat used by the United States Navy from 1917 until 1919 along the east coast and the Great Lakes region.
 , is an American oceanographic research vessel at the Woods Hole Oceanographic Institution since 1997.  The title is held by US Navy and operated under charter agreement with the Office of Naval Research.

Sources

United States Navy ship names